Disquiet Heart is an historical crime novel by the American writer Randall Silvis set in 1847 in Pittsburgh, Pennsylvania.

It tells the story of Edgar Allan Poe, whose wife has just died, and his protégé, narrator Augie Dubbins, as they visit Pittsburgh at the invitation of Dr. Brunrichter, who takes an eager interest in Poe's writings. At the same time, young women are vanishing from the streets of Pittsburgh. Augie and Poe set out to investigate the murders.

The novel is the sequel to On Night's Shore, in which Edgar Allan Poe investigates the murder of shopgirl Mary Rogers in Manhattan of 1840.

Sources
 Contemporary Authors Online. The Gale Group, 2006. PEN (Permanent Entry Number):  0000091276.

External links
  Book Page @ Amazon.com

2002 American novels
American crime novels
Novels set in Pittsburgh
Fiction set in 1847
Novels set in the 1840s
Historical crime novels